"No One Like You" is a song by German rock band Scorpions. It was written by band members Rudolf Schenker (guitar) and Klaus Meine (vocals) and released as the lead single from the band's eighth studio album Blackout (1982). It was produced by Dieter Dierks and was recorded at Dierks' studio.

Background
"No One Like You" first appeared on the band's 1982 album Blackout. It was one of three hit singles from the record. The track also appeared on multiple greatest hits-type albums including:  Best of Rockers 'n' Ballads, Bad for Good: The Very Best of Scorpions, and Box of Scorpions.

A video was shot for the song in San Francisco. It features Alcatraz Island—with Klaus Meine being the recipient of capital punishment.

The track was originally written in German and much of its meaning changed in translation.

Reception
The song reached number 65 on the Billboard Hot 100 singles chart. It also attained the number 1 position on the US Billboard Rock Tracks chart. The track peaked at number 49 in Canada.

The Scorpions released a live version as a taster for their forthcoming live album World Wide Live in 1984, along with their second hit “Big City Nights.” The record's flipside also features a performance of their classic "The Zoo."

Chart history

Personnel
Klaus Meine – lead vocals
Rudolf Schenker – rhythm guitar
Matthias Jabs – lead guitar
Francis Buchholz – bass guitar
Herman Rarebell – drums
Dieter Dierks – producer

Covers and soundtracks
"No One Like You" was covered by Lagwagon on their 2000 album Let's Talk About Leftovers. Cover versions of the track are also playable in the video games: Guitar Hero Encore: Rocks the 80s and Rock Revolution. The song was sampled in the song "4 Da Gang" by 42 Dugg and Roddy Ricch. & Pass It Down To Me (2014) By Brian Allen and Euro From Young Money

The song is featured in the TV show Supernatural, the film Rock of Ages and video game Rock Band 4.

See also
List of Billboard Mainstream Rock number-one songs of the 1980s

References

External links
The Scorpions official website
 

Scorpions (band) songs
1982 singles
Songs written by Klaus Meine
Songs written by Rudolf Schenker
Harvest Records singles
Mercury Records singles
1982 songs